Public School No. 10 is a historic school building located at Troy in Rensselaer County, New York.  It was built in 1898 and is an "H" shaped, three story, hard glazed orange brick building on an elevated basement in the Georgian Revival style.  It has limestone and terra cotta trim. The entrance features a projecting terra cotta portico on a raised brick and limestone base.  It was converted to multi-family housing in 1992.

It was listed on the National Register of Historic Places in 1994.

References

School buildings on the National Register of Historic Places in New York (state)
Georgian Revival architecture in New York (state)
School buildings completed in 1898
Buildings and structures in Rensselaer County, New York
National Register of Historic Places in Troy, New York